The four-man bobsleigh competition at the 1972 Winter Olympics in Sapporo was held on 11 and 12 February, at Sapporo Teine.

Results

References

Bobsleigh at the 1972 Winter Olympics